Hamburg is a Sachsen-class frigate of the German Navy.

Construction and commissioning
Built by Howaldtswerke-Deutsche Werft, Kiel, Hamburg was the second of the Sachsen class to be launched and then commissioned into the German Navy. She is based at Wilhelmshaven, initially as part of 1. Fregattengeschwader with the other ships of the Sachsen class, and from 9 January 2005 as part of the 2. Fregattengeschwader, which itself became part of the new Einsatzflottille 2 on 27 June 2005.

Service
Hamburg joined Operation Atalanta, the EU-led anti-piracy mission, in November 2010. She was on deployment with EUNAVFOR until March 2011. Between 24 March and 3 June 2013 Hamburg deployed with the  carrier combat group, and was tasked with co-ordinating all flight movements within a radius of 180 km, including all take-offs and landings on the carrier. Hamburg was the first German ship to fully integrate into an American Strike group, and it was the first time in the history of the US Navy that a German frigate was entrusted with the sole protection of an American aircraft carrier.

On 11 February 2014 Hamburg deployed from Wilhelmshaven with the frigates Mecklenburg-Vorpommern and  Augsburg, the corvette Oldenburg  and the storeship Frankfurt am Main to take part in the navy's annual training and exercises. These concluded at Kiel on 20 June 2014, during which time the ships carried out manoeuvrers as far north as the Arctic Circle and as far south as the Equator, visiting 13 ports in nine countries. During this time she participated in the celebrations marking the 825th birthday of Hamburg Harbour from 9 to 11 May 2014, when she led a parade of ships into the harbour. Hamburg escorted Cape Ray through the Northeast Atlantic, across the North and Baltic Seas, to Finland and Germany.

Hamburg later became the flagship of Standing NATO Maritime Group 2, and on 8 June 2015 sailed from Wilhelmshaven for a Mediterranean deployment. She took part in the NATO exercise "Trident Juncture" and in Operation Active Endeavour, returning to Wilhelmshaven on 20 December 2015. 

On 4 August 2020 Hamburg sailed for 5-month deployment with Operation Irini, the EU operation enforcing the United Nations arms embargo on Libya. The ship is expected to remain almost entirely at sea during the operation, so her personnel are not exposed to the coronavirus.

References

Sachsen-class frigates
2002 ships
Ships built in Kiel
Frigates of Germany